The Buenos Aires Lawn Tennis Club is a private tennis club located in the Palermo neighborhood of Buenos Aires, Argentina. The club is the host of the ATP Buenos Aires, an ATP Tour tournament played on clay. Buenos Aires Lawn Tennis Club is a founding member of the Argentine Tennis Association, established 2 September 1921, along with Quilmes, Ferrocarril del Sud, GEBA, Lomas, Belgrano, Ferro Carril Oeste, and Estudiantes BA and 12 other institutions.

The main stadium court, Horacio Billoch Caride Stadium, has a capacity of 5,500 spectators and is named after former club president Horacio Billoch Caride, considered one of the most notable tennis executives, which also presided the Argentine Tennis Association. The stadium has hosted numerous Davis Cup and Fed Cup ties.

History 

Origins of the foundation of a tennis club in Buenos Aires can be found on a letter sent by Arthur Herbert, W. H. Watson, Adrián Penard, C.R. Thursby, H. M. Mills, and F. E. Wallace, who made a proposal to the British community living in Argentina to establish an institution focused on that sport. With the first meeting held in the British Consulate, Penard offered a land he owned on Alvear and Callao Avenues, suggesting the name "Alvear Lawn Tennis Club".

As the initiative received approval from other members, they formed a committee, which concluded that the land on Alvear avenue was not appropriated enough to establish a club due its small size that would only allowed to build two courts. As a result, they chose a land on Vicente López and Ayacucho street, owned by Federico Leloir and the club was officially founded on April 19, with Arthur Herbert appointed as president. With the money earned from the fees, the club built four courts, a clothing and other facilities.
 

When members of Rosario Lawn Tennis Club (another predecessor club situated in Rosario, Santa Fe) heard about a new tennis club in Buenos Aires, they offered to play a match between eight players from both cities. The BALTC accepted the invitation so that would be the first match held in the BALTC, on June 29, 1892.

As the BALTC activities and number of members increased, the club decided to move to a bigger place. After considering several locations, the committee was granted concession for a land located besides Central Argentine Railway's Golf station (Lisandro de la Torre station nowadays). After the land was reconditioned, the club built four courts there. The new facilities were inaugurated on June 12, 1920. The club has remained there since then.

Stadium 
The stadium and main court of BALTC is the "Horacio Billoch Caride Stadium" with a capacity for 5,500 spectators. Since 2003, the club has also hosted an exhibition tournament, La copa Argentina de tenis Peugeot (Peugeot Argentina Tennis Cup), in December which features top tour players. During that event, the stadium's surface is hard court instead of usual clay.

In 2015, there was a proposal to rename the Billoch Caride Stadium, changing to "Guillermo Vilas" to honor the best Argentine player ever, who had given his first steps as player in the BALTC, at 15 years old. Vilas had also debuted for the Argentine team that played v Chile in the South American zone of the 1970 Davis Cup held in BALTC. However, the initiative did not prosper.

In 2018, the BALTC was the venue for all the tennis tournaments at the 2018 Youth Olympic Games, being the first time the court hosted an olympic competition.

Gallery

Former notable tournaments
River Plate Championships (1893-1998)

See also

 List of tennis stadiums by capacity

References

External links

 

b
b
b
b
b